The 2000 Kansas State Wildcats football team represented Kansas State University in the 2000 NCAA Division I-A football season.  The team's head coach was Bill Snyder.  The Wildcats played their home games in KSU Stadium.  2000 saw the Wildcats finish with a record of 11–3, and a 6–2 record in Big 12 Conference play, including a 29–28 win over the Nebraska Cornhuskers, and winning Big 12 North division.  The season culminated with a win over Tennessee in the Cotton Bowl Classic.

Schedule

Roster

Rankings

Game summaries

Oklahoma

Texas A&M

Iowa State

Nebraska

Oklahoma (Big 12 Championship Game)

Statistics

Score by quarter

Team

Offense

Rushing

Passing

Receiving

References

Kansas State
Kansas State Wildcats football seasons
Cotton Bowl Classic champion seasons
Kansas State Wildcats football